Oasis Academy Shirley Park (formerly Ashburton Community School) is a mixed all-through school located within the Ashburton Learning Village complex in the Woodside area of Croydon, Greater London, England.

The school educates children of primary and secondary school age, and also has a sixth form. It is based on three sites: Shirley Road, Long Lane, Stroud Green. Originally two schools, Ashburton Secondary Modern Boys and Ashburton Secondary Modern Girls, which merged in 1971 to become Ashburton High School. At a later date, the school became Ashburton Community School and became an Academy in 2009 and was renamed Oasis Academy Shirley Park. The school is sponsored by the Oasis Trust.

The academy has a partnership with local English Premier League-club Crystal Palace dating back to the former Community School. Former Shrewsbury Town winger Austin Berkley teaches at the Academy.

Description
Oasis Academy Shirley Park is part of the Oasis Community Learning group, and evangelical Christian charity.  The trust have guided forty schools out of special measures. 19 per cent of the 52 Oasis academies classified as failing. The trust's founder Reverend Steve Chalke says "Turning round a school is sometimes a quick fix, it really, truly is". Oasis Academy Shirley Park was judged an outstanding school in 2013 and again in 2018 it was a good school but with potential to speedily become outstanding again.

Curriculum
Virtually all maintained schools and academies follow the National Curriculum, and there success is judged on how well they succeed in delivering a 'broad and balanced curriculum'. Schools endeavour to get all students to achieve the English Baccalaureate(EBACC) qualification- this must include core subjects a modern or ancient foreign language, and either History or Geography.

The academy operates a three-year, Key Stage 3 where all the core National Curriculum subjects are taught. This is a transition period from primary to secondary education, that builds on the skills, knowledge and understanding gained at primary school, and introduces youngsters who are starting from a lower than average base to wider, robust and challenging programmes of study needed to gain qualifications at Key Stage 4.

At Key Stage 4 the focus is on the EBACC, and there are daily Maths, English and Science lessons- plus some options. Spanish is the taught Modern Language.

EYFS Key Stage 1 Key Stage 2
This is an all through school where the Early Years Foundation Stage (EYFS) provides stimulating environments where 3yr and 4yr olds can play, explore, experiment, develop confidence, be curiosity to learn through play. The primary section- is equivalent to a Key Stage 1 and Key Stage 2, or a Primary School. Key Stage 1 is about accustomising the children to the  practices of the classroom, number bonds and phonics. The National Curriculum defines a broad list of subjects that should be taught by means of broad topics:
 Art
 Computing
 Dance
 Design Technology
 Drama
 English
 Geography
 History
 Mathematics
 Music
 PE - including Swimming
 Peer Massage
 Personal, Social Citizenship and Health Education (PSCHE)
 Philosophy for Children (P4C)
 Religious Education
 Science
 Social and Emotional Aspects of Learning (SEAL)
 Spanish (KS2)
The revision of 2014, made the English syllabus concentrate on formal grammar, this is all tested by Key Stage 2 SATs. This is alleged to prepare the student to subject oriented Key Stage 3, and is inspected by Ofsted, but remains controversial.

Notable former pupils

Aaron Wan-Bissaka, footballer with Manchester United F.C, attended 2009–2014.
Jerome Williams, footballer with Crystal Palace, attended 2004–2010.
Alex Wynter, footballer with Crystal Palace, attended 2005–2010.

Ashburton Community School
Neal Ardley, manager at AFC Wimbledon and former footballer with Wimbledon F.C.
Dean Leacock, footballer with Notts County.
Simon Osborn, joint manager at Margate and former footballer with Wolverhampton Wanderers, attended 1983–1989.
Damian Scannell, footballer with Sutton United, attended 1996–2001.
Sean Scannell, footballer with Huddersfield Town, attended 2002–2007.
Ibra Sekajja, footballer with Crystal Palace, attended 2004–2009.
Mike Leeder, Hong Kong based Casting Director and Film Producer, attended 1979-1984.

References

External links
Oasis Academy Shirley Park official website

Primary schools in the London Borough of Croydon
Secondary schools in the London Borough of Croydon
Academies in the London Borough of Croydon
Shirley Park